Witchingseason are an English 4-piece alt-rock band, widely known for their dark, hypnotic noise, with songs like The Healer and Codeine.  With their new album 'Melancholy Disco', Witchingseason continue to explore the balance between lo-fi and high-energy alt-rock, with the hypnotic vocals of Reynolds.

Their first EP, 'Celosia', attracted critical success, with airplay on BBC Radio 1's Daniel P Carters Rock Show, DAB station Planet Rock and their debut music video on UK 'Scuzz TV'.

Since their formation, Witchingseason have released 5 singles, an eponymous EP and Celosia (along with a music video for their hit single 'The Healer'), and more recently their debut studio album; Melancholy Disco.

Witchingseason broke into the mainstream in 2017, with Metal Talk describing the band as (having a) "...macabre and ethereal low-fi sludgy sound..." and their album Celosia as "...a wealth of rocking talent, gasoline drenched guitars and doom sensibilities which are all beautifully demonstrated in the track 'Celosia' and the hypnotic blues rock of 'Codeine'. Heavy and impressive guitar riffs are teamed with fierce drum beats and all stitched together with Tom Reynolds' coarse and captivating vocals."

The band's self-released singles and EP's have sold thousands worldwide, with Grande Rock saying of Witchingseason "It's not hard to see how this sound can make an impact, its immediacy speaks for itself and is the reason why not too long ago the band were able to play a huge live show at the prestigious 100 Club in London."

Their debut album 'Melancholy Disco', preceded by singles 'Melancholy Disco' and 'Afraid of the Dark' were released in November 2018 and received positive critical reviews.

History

Formation and first EP (2014–2016) 
Witchingseason was formed in Essex in 2014 by guitarist/vocalist Tom Reynolds and bassist James R Willians, who then recruited drummer Wayne Summers to form the hard rock trio. They cite their influences as artists such as Soundgarden, Alice in Chains, Queens of the Stone Age and Masters of Reality, forging their own grungy, gritty, psychedelia-tinged alt.rock sound.

Following the departure of James L Willians in 2015, Jack Turner (formerly of Leogun) joined the band, lending his signature 'weaving bass' into the mix.  In 2017, blues bassist Gary Summers joined the group, replacing Jack Turner, and in 2018 Brendan Stone Leak added a second guitar and keyboards leading to the band's ethereal apocalyptic sound.

Known for their hard work and intimidating live performances, the first few singles and self-titled EP garnered some positive reviews, but it wasn't until their singles 'Spiders' and 'Codeine' and then the EP 'Celosia' that Witchingseason attracted critical interest.

Celosia (2016–2017) 
With their first, self-released full EP; Celosia, Witchingseason received much critical praise and a renewed interest in the band.  This led to some national press coverage and radio / TV play of the album's single; The 'Healer'.

Melancholy Disco (2018) 
Witchingseasons first, self-released full studio album; Melancholy Disco, featuring previously released singles 'Melancholy Disco' and 'Afraid of the Dark' (for which there was an accompanying music video).

Phantom Transmission (2018) 
Recording 'Melancholy Disco' at Tom Donovan (of Monster Florence) Studio, the band recorded additional 'Bootleg-style' live studio video recordings to accompany the album.  Typically deliberately over-mastered, the resulting videos showcases the band's talent for twisting their otherwise mainstream rock sound to produce an eerie, ethereal and apocalyptic feel that gives them their unique identity.

Live (2014–2018) 
The band began touring small to medium venues in 2015 and soon received notable attention from the press and media due to their energetic and intimidating live performances and soon began to gain a quickly growing fan base.

This led to Witchingseason playing prestigious venues such as the 100 Club in London and supporting acts like StoneWire on their tour.

The band have aligned themselves with a number of charitable organisations, such as Musicians Against Homelessness, Safe Gigs for Women, and OxJam (for which they played the Camden Festival in 2017).

Staunch supporters of live music in and around the Camden area, Witchingseason have played a number of events for Camden Rocks Presents, including the 2017 festival (Headlined by Maximo Park and Public Image Limited) and the run up to the 2018 festival.

With a love for playing live, Witchingseason continue to play live shows throughout the UK, currently promoting their debut studio album 'Melancholy Disco'.

Releases 
Spiders – 2014 (Self-release)
Released as a single ahead of Witchingseasons self-titled debut EP.

Codeine – 2014 (Self-release)
Released as a single ahead of Witchingseasons self-titled debut EP.

Witchingseason – 2015 (Self-release)
Once the band became busy with frequent gigs in the UK, they self-released a 5 track CD, showcasing studio versions of the top fan favourites songs from their live performances

The Healer – 2017 (Self-release)
Released as a single ahead of Witchingseasons EP; 'Celosia'.

Celosia – 2017 (2017)
Their debut EP was released on in July 2017, featuring previously self-released singles.

Melancholy Disco (single) – 2018 (Self-release)
Released as a single ahead of Witchingseasons debut studio album; 'Melancholy Disco'.

Afraid of the Dark – 2018 (Self-release)
Released as a single ahead of Witchingseasons debut studio album; 'Melancholy Disco'.

Melancholy Disco (album) – 2018 (2018)
Their debut album was released on in November 2018.

Music Videos 
 "The Healer" (2017)
 "Afraid of the Dark" (2018)
 "Takes One To Know One" (Phantom Sessions, live recorded at Tom Donovan Studio) (2018)
 "Kaleidoscope" (Phantom Sessions, live recorded at Tom Donovan Studio) (2018)

Band members 
 Tom Reynolds – lead vocals, lead guitar (2014–present)
 Jack Turner – bass guitar, backing vocals (2015–2016)
 Wayne Summers – drums, percussion, backing vocals (2016–present)
 Gary Summers – bass guitar, backing vocals (2016–present)
 Brendan Stone Leak – guitars, backing vocals, keyboards (2017–present)

References 

English alternative rock groups
Musical groups established in 2014
Musical groups from Essex
2014 establishments in England